Theunis Petrus Daniël Briers  (11 July 1929 – 7 October 2018) was a South African rugby union player.

Playing career
Briers matriculated at Paarl Boys' High School and played club rugby for the Paarl RC.

Briers made his test match debut for  against Robin Thompson's British Lions side in 1955 at Ellis Park in front of over 90,000 fans and scored two tries. He initially declared himself unavailable for the Springbok tour to Australia and New Zealand in 1956, but was called up as a replacement and joined the tour in time for the second test against the All Blacks. Briers also played in 5 tour matches during the New Zealand leg of the tour and scored 4 tries.

Test history

See also
List of South Africa national rugby union players – Springbok no. 313

References

1929 births
2018 deaths
South African rugby union players
South Africa international rugby union players
Western Province (rugby union) players
Sportspeople from Paarl
Rugby union players from the Western Cape
Rugby union wings